Stodoła or Stodola is a surname. Notable people with the surname include:

Aurel Stodola (1859–1942), Slovak engineer, physicist, and inventor
Edwin King Stodola (1914–1992), American radio engineer
 Emil Stodola (1862-1945), Slovak politician and lawyer
Ivan Stodola (1888–1977), Slovak dramatist and writer
Mark Stodola (born 1949), American politician and lawyer

See also
 3981 Stodola, minor planet